Tamil input methods refer to different systems developed to type Tamil language characters using a typewriter or a computer keyboard.
Several programs such as Azhagi and NHM writer provide both fixed and phonetic type layouts for typing.

Fixed Computer Layouts

Phonetic Computer Layouts
 Google transliteration
 Google Input Method Editors(Google IME)
 Microsoft Tamil Transliteration
 Transliteration provided by Azhagi software

See also
Tamil blogosphere
Tamil Keyboard

 
Indic computing